Jimmy Paul (born November 25  in Montreal, Quebec) is a Canadian former professional boxer in the lightweight division. He was the International Boxing Federation'25s world Lightweight champion from 1985-when he beat Harry Arroyo by a 15 round unanimous decision to 1986, when he lost to Greg Haugen, also by 15 round decision. Paul also defeated Andy Ganigan, Robin Blake, Cubanito Perez and Darryl Tyson, among others.

Professional boxing record

See also 
Kronk Gym
Emmanuel Steward
Milton McCrory
Thomas Hearns
Hilmer Kenty

References

External links 
 

1959 births
Living people
World boxing champions
Boxers from South Carolina
American male boxers
Boxers from Detroit
Lightweight boxers